William Reginald Minton (born June 10, 1941) is an American retired basketball coach. He served as the men's basketball head coach at Dartmouth College in 1984 and at the United States Air Force Academy from 1985 to 2000. From 2000 to 2020, he was deputy executive director of the National Association of Basketball Coaches.

Head coaching record

References

External links
 Air Force profile (1997)

1941 births
Living people
Air Force Falcons men's basketball coaches
American men's basketball coaches
American men's basketball players
Dartmouth Big Green men's basketball coaches
Wooster Fighting Scots men's basketball players
Forwards (basketball)